Charity gambling is a "form of incentivized giving" where a charity (or a group of charities), rather than a municipality or private casino, oversees gambling activities such as bingo, roulette, lottery, and slot machines and uses the proceeds to further its charitable aims.

Characteristics
Charity lotteries tend to:
 Be privately operated without political interference
 Not retain private profits (i.e., the primary aim is to raise funds for the charity)
 Donate "a substantial part" of the funds to the charity (according to the Association of Charity Lotteries in the European Union, "ideally, the operational costs of the lottery do not exceed 20% of turnover, with the remaining 80% equally divided between donations to charities (40%) and prize money (40%)")
 Support a charity's overall objectives, rather than specific projects or activities
 Provide long-term funding prospects as a "reliable partner"

As a form of incentivized giving, supporters are rewarded, which makes it more likely to draw donations from those who may not have otherwise. Furthermore, charities can add these donators to their database and reach out to them in other fundraising capacities. Philanthropists like this method of fundraising because it is a "predictable way of generating income".

In the UK 
In the UK, lotteries are permitted provided they raise money for charities. By law, the charity must receive at least 20% of the value of the lottery ticket. These lotteries are sold in competition with the National Lottery but operate under tighter regulations. For example, a lottery run for charity can have a maximum jackpot of £200,000 whereas the National Lottery has no maximum.

Online gambling, operated offshore of the UK, is not regulated in the same way. With the increasing popularity of online bingo, a charity bingo site called "BigHeartBingo" and BigHeartBingo.com has been set up on a nonprofit basis to raise funds for charity in the same way that lotteries do. BigHeartBingo was founded by Jeremy Collis, formerly CEO of Littlewoods Lotteries, the largest provider of charity lotteries in the UK. BigHeartBingo raises money for major charities like Cancer Research, National Society for the Prevention of Cruelty to Children, Save the Children, Age Concern, Great Ormond Street Hospital, Royal National Institute of Blind People, and Comic Relief amongst many. However, BigHeartbingo players' favourites are wildlife and animal welfare charities such as World Wildlife Fund, Born Free Foundation, Battersea Dogs Home, Dogs Trust and Cats Protection. It also supports smaller charities around the world such as Animal Rescue Egypt, Chobe WildlifeRescue in Botswana and now bear sanctuaries such as Bear With Us and North West Wildlife Sanctuary in Canada.

The Gambling Act of 2005 permitted the sale of charity lottery tickets from machines, and Gamestec Plc and Tabboxx (UK) Ltd rolled out Tabboxx lottery vending machines throughout UK pubs. Ironically, Tabboxx machines are often being used to replace cigarette machines in those pubs. Major pub chains in the UK, including Punch, Marston's, and Greene King, are removing cigarette machines across the UK and replacing them with TaBBOXX lottery machines. In January 2012, as the London Olympics approached, TaBBOXX joined Dame Kelly Holmes Legacy Trust in launching a lottery to raise money for sports programs for disadvantaged youths.

Australia
In Australia, regulations relating to charity fund-raising varies among the different states and territories, for example, in South Australia, Consumer and Business Services administers the state Lottery and Gaming Act 1936, which regulates lotteries and bingo run by charities.

References

See also 
 Big Lottery Fund
 Nationale Postcode Loterij (Netherlands)
 Novamedia
 People's Postcode Lottery (UK)
 Philippine Lottery Draw

Charity fundraising
Gambling and society